

References

S